Attagirl is the sixth studio album by the Dutch band Bettie Serveert, released January 25, 2005.

Track listing
All tracks by Carol van Dijk and Peter Visser except where noted.
"Dreamaniacs" – 3:50
"Attagirl" – 3:53
"Don't Touch That Dial!" – 3:37
"Greyhound Song" – 3:21
"You've Changed" – 4:33 
"Versace" – 5:16 
"1 Off Deal" – 2:35
"Hands Off" – 3:35
"Staying Kind" – 4:40
"Lover I Don't Have to Love" (Bright Eyes) – 5:48
"Dreamaniacs" (acoustic) – 3:40
"Attagirl" (acoustic) – 3:54

References

2005 albums
Bettie Serveert albums
Minty Fresh Records albums